William Macnish (29 October 1842 – 29 November 1873) was an Australian cricketer. He played one first-class match for New South Wales in 1862/63.

See also
 List of New South Wales representative cricketers

References

External links
 

1842 births
1873 deaths
Australian cricketers
New South Wales cricketers
Cricketers from Sydney